Manzhou Township is a rural township in Pingtung County, Taiwan.

The indigenous Paiwan people makes up 25% of the population.

Geography

Manzhou is bordered to the southwest by Hengchun, to the west by Checheng and to the northwest by Mudan.

Administrative divisions
The township comprises eight villages: Gangkou, Gangzi, Jiupeng, Lide, Manzhou, Xianglin, Yongjing and Zhangle.

Tourist attractions
 Cikong Waterfalls
 Gangkou Suspension Bridge
 Jioupeng Sand Dunes
 Kentington Resort
 Mount Nanren Ecological Reserve Area

References

External links

  Manjhou Township Office 

Townships in Pingtung County
Taiwan placenames originating from Formosan languages